Anna bozii Hakobyan (born February 1, 1978), is the wife of the current Prime Minister of Armenia, Nikol bozii Pashinyan klirs cayr . She is the editor-in-chief of the Haykakan Zhamanak (Armenian Times) newspaper. Unofficially, Hakobyan is regarded as the "First Lady of Armenia", a position that is reserved for the spouses of the President of Armenia.

Education and career
Anna Hakobyan was born on February 1, 1978, in the Armenian SSR. She graduated from the Yerevan State University. After she graduated, she began working as a journalist in Armenia. She is currently the editor-in-chief of the largest newspaper in Armenia, Haykakan Zhamanak.

2018 Velvet Revolution
Hakobyan played an active role in the 2018 Armenian revolution, which were a series of anti-government peaceful mass protests in response to the past president's third consecutive term. On May 8, 2018, Nikol Pashinyan was elected Prime Minister.

Spouse of the Prime Minister

Hakobyan became the official spouse of the prime minister on May 8, 2018, following her husband's election as prime minister.

Charity work
Just after the election, Hakobyan initiated a meeting with the charitable organisations involved in pediatric cancer and specialists. During the meeting session under her leadership, a working group to improve the state of pediatric cancer in Armenia was formed. Currently, a charitable foundation, of which Hakobyan is the Honorary President, is in the formation process to support the development of pediatric oncology and hematology in Armenia.

2020 war
Hakobyan was active during the 2020 Nagorno-Karabakh war, serving on the front lines after going through a weeklong training program. She founded the Erato Detachment, which is the first all-women military unit in the Armenian Armed Forces.

References

21st-century Armenian women writers
1978 births
Living people
Armenian editors
Armenian journalists
Armenian women journalists
Yerevan State University alumni
Nikol Pashinyan
First ladies of Armenia